Michael Rene Mularkey (born November 19, 1961) is a former American football coach and tight end in the National Football League (NFL). He played college football for the University of Florida, and was drafted in the ninth round of the 1983 NFL Draft by the San Francisco 49ers and lasted until the final round of cuts. Mularkey then signed with the Minnesota Vikings with whom he played for six seasons before playing another three with the Pittsburgh Steelers.

Mularkey has since served as the head coach of the Buffalo Bills, Jacksonville Jaguars and Tennessee Titans, the offensive coordinator for the Steelers, Miami Dolphins and Atlanta Falcons, and the tight ends coach for the Dolphins, Titans, Tampa Bay Buccaneers, and Falcons.

Early years
Mularkey was born in Ft. Lauderdale, Florida.  He attended Northeast High School in Oakland Park, Florida, and played quarterback for the Northeast Hurricanes high school football team.

College career
Mularkey attended the University of Florida in Gainesville, Florida, where he played tight end for coach Charley Pell's Florida Gators football team from 1980 to 1982. Mularkey finished his college career with 55 catches for 628 yards and three touchdowns.

Professional career
In 1983, Mularkey was a ninth-round draft pick for the San Francisco 49ers, but was released before appearing in a game. He went on to play with the Minnesota Vikings until the conclusion of the 1988 season. In 1989, Mularkey signed with the Pittsburgh Steelers as a free agent for the final three years of his playing career. In his nine NFL seasons, Mularkey played in 114 regular-season games, started 46 of them, and caught 102 passes for 1,222 yards and nine touchdowns.

Career statistics

Coaching career

Concordia University-St. Paul, Minnesota
Mularkey was given his first coaching position as an offensive/defensive line coach at Concordia University in St. Paul Minnesota for the 1993–94 season. He worked under head coach Tom Cross. Mularkey held the offensive/defensive lineman coaching position for one season.

Tampa Bay Buccaneers
Mularkey started his NFL coaching career in 1994 with the Tampa Bay Buccaneers as a quality control coach for both the offense and defense. In 1995, he was promoted to tight ends coach and held the position for one season.

Pittsburgh Steelers
Mularkey was hired as the Steelers' tight ends coach in 1996 and held the position until the end of the 2000 season, when he replaced Kevin Gilbride as the team's offensive coordinator. He has a reputation for being an offense-oriented head coach with a penchant for trick plays. His skill for creating special packages to utilize multi-dimensional players such as Hines Ward and Antwaan Randle El earned him the nickname "Inspector Gadget."

Buffalo Bills
In 2004, Mularkey left the Steelers and was hired by the Buffalo Bills to succeed Gregg Williams as the team's head coach. Mularkey started out his first campaign as Bills head coach with a record of 0–4. He rallied his team to a 9–7 record by the end of the season, however, sparked by a six-game winning streak during which the Bills scored more points than in any other similar stretch in franchise history. However, a loss to the Pittsburgh Steelers in the regular-season finale kept the Bills out of the playoffs. Overall, they were seventh in the league in total offense. This would be the Bills’ last winning season until 2014.

Mularkey’s second season in Buffalo was far less successful. Dogged by a quarterback controversy between J. P. Losman and Kelly Holcomb and a series of defensive personnel problems, Mularkey led the team to a 5–11 finish and a sixth consecutive year out of the playoffs – the longest such active streak in the American Football Conference (AFC). Mularkey's offensive schemes continued to be touted by then-general manager Tom Donahoe, despite the lack of production, finishing 24th in total offense.

On January 12, 2006, Mularkey resigned as head coach of the Bills, citing a disagreement in the direction of the organization, who had recently hired new management, including ex-coach Marv Levy.

Miami Dolphins
On January 22, 2006, Mularkey was hired to be the Miami Dolphins' offensive coordinator. As the offensive coordinator under Miami's head coach, Nick Saban, Mularkey had an unsuccessful season with injuries to his first-string quarterback Daunte Culpepper and starting running back Ronnie Brown. The Dolphins only scored 16.3 points per game, ranking 29th in the NFL. Following the season, it was announced Saban had resigned as Dolphins head coach and he accepted the position of head coach of the Alabama Crimson Tide football team at the University of Alabama on January 3, 2007.

Upon the hiring of former San Diego Chargers offensive coordinator Cam Cameron as Dolphins head coach on January 19, 2007, it was announced that Mularkey would no longer serve as offensive coordinator but would remain with the team in another capacity. On March 15, 2007, it was officially announced that Cameron himself would call the offensive plays in 2007, leaving Mularkey to serve as tight ends coach.

Atlanta Falcons
On January 25, 2008, it was announced that Mularkey would become the next offensive coordinator for the Atlanta Falcons.

In Mularkey's first season in Atlanta, the Falcons finished with an 11–5 record and the offense rushed for 152.5 rushing yards per game, second most in the league. The Falcons also finished 10th in the NFL in scoring (up from 29th the previous year) with 24.4 points per game, and sixth in yards with 361.2 per game. Mularkey was named the Assistant Coach of the Year by Pro Football Writers of America following the 2008 season.

Following a 13–3 season in 2010, Mularkey was named the Offensive Coordinator of the Year by Sporting News. He interviewed with multiple NFL teams for their head coaching vacancies for 2011.

Jacksonville Jaguars
On January 11, 2012, Mularkey accepted the head coaching job for the Jacksonville Jaguars, making him the third full-time head coach in franchise history. His first win came in Week 3 against the Indianapolis Colts. Mularkey led the team to a 2–14 record.

On January 10, 2013, the Jaguars fired Mularkey after only one season, which was the worst in franchise history. He had two years remaining on a three-year contract. However, Jaguars general manager David Caldwell, who had been hired on January 8, 2013, decided that the Jaguars needed "an immediate and clean restart" after winning only seven games in the past two seasons.

Tennessee Titans
On January 22, 2014, the Tennessee Titans announced they hired Mularkey as their tight ends coach. He was given the title of assistant head coach the following season.

On November 3, 2015, the Titans relieved Ken Whisenhunt of head coaching duties and announced that Mularkey would step in as interim head coach for the rest of the season. He had a 2–7 record as interim head coach as the Titans finished with a league-worst 3–13 record.

On January 16, 2016, the Titans announced that they would retain Mularkey as their full-time head coach on a three-year contract in a highly criticized move by their fans and the media, who characterized the hire as "uninspired" and "awful". Mularkey was given full control over his staff, and on January 18, 2016, he hired former Atlanta Falcons wide receivers coach Terry Robiskie as the offensive coordinator and promoted assistant defensive coordinator Dick LeBeau to defensive coordinator. Mularkey stated that the Titans would run an "exotic smashmouth" offense in 2016, meaning that they would go run-heavy, like a 1970s offense.

After starting the season 1–3, the Titans beat the Cleveland Browns and Miami Dolphins to improve to 3–3. Thanks to a last-minute Week 2 16–15 road victory over the Detroit Lions, a Week 10 47–25 blowout win against the Green Bay Packers, and a game-winning 53-yard field goal to beat the Kansas City Chiefs on the road by a score of 19–17 in Week 14, the team came within just one game of earning an AFC South division title and a trip to the playoffs, ending with a 9–7 record, the first winning season for Tennessee since 2011. The Titans sent five players to the Pro Bowl, their highest number since 2008.

In 2017, the Titans again finished with a 9–7 record, making the playoffs for the first time in nine years with a 15–10 victory over the Jacksonville Jaguars in the regular-season finale. The Titans sent six players to the Pro Bowl. In the wild-card round, the Titans rallied from a 21–3 halftime deficit against the Chiefs to narrowly win on the road by a score of 22–21; this was their first playoff victory since 2003.

After the Titans' 35–14 road loss to the New England Patriots in the divisional round of the playoffs the following week, Mularkey and the Titans agreed to part ways.

Atlanta Falcons (second stint)
After a year away from coaching, Mularkey was hired to be the Falcons' tight end coach on January 8, 2019.

Retirement
On January 9, 2020, Mularkey announced his retirement from coaching.

Head coaching record

* – Interim head coach

Personal life
Mularkey is married to Elizabeth "Betsy" Conant Mularkey, who is also a University of Florida graduate. They have two sons, Patrick and Shane. Shane was a scholarship football player at University of North Carolina, but ended his playing days after shoulder surgery.

See also

 Florida Gators football, 1980–89
 List of Buffalo Bills head coaches
 List of Florida Gators in the NFL Draft
 List of Pittsburgh Steelers players

References

Bibliography
 Carlson, Norm, University of Florida Football Vault: The History of the Florida Gators, Whitman Publishing, LLC, Atlanta, Georgia (2007).  .
 Golenbock, Peter, Go Gators!  An Oral History of Florida's Pursuit of Gridiron Glory, Legends Publishing, LLC, St. Petersburg, Florida (2002).  .
 Hairston, Jack, Tales from the Gator Swamp: A Collection of the Greatest Gator Stories Ever Told, Sports Publishing, LLC, Champaign, Illinois (2002).  .
 McCarthy, Kevin M.,  Fightin' Gators: A History of University of Florida Football, Arcadia Publishing, Mount Pleasant, South Carolina (2000).  .
 Nash, Noel, ed., The Gainesville Sun Presents The Greatest Moments in Florida Gators Football, Sports Publishing, Inc., Champaign, Illinois (1998).  .

1961 births
Living people
American football tight ends
Atlanta Falcons coaches
Concordia Golden Bears football coaches
Buffalo Bills head coaches
Florida Gators football players
Jacksonville Jaguars head coaches
Miami Dolphins coaches
Minnesota Vikings players
National Football League offensive coordinators
Pittsburgh Steelers coaches
Pittsburgh Steelers players
Players of American football from Fort Lauderdale, Florida
Tampa Bay Buccaneers coaches
Tennessee Titans coaches
Tennessee Titans head coaches
Ed Block Courage Award recipients